Qiloane is a community council located in the Maseru District of Lesotho. Its population in 2006 was 24,093.

Mount Qiloane

The profile of Mount Qiloane, the legendary conical mountain close to Thaba Bosiu, and described by Masupha as Mother and Father, inspired the traditional Basotho Hat called mokorotlo. It is about  broad on top, and is composed of three immense steps gradually tapering to a point. Elevation of the hilltop is 5,640 ft (1,719 m) and is located at coordinates .

Villages
The community of Qiloane includes the villages of Boqate (Ha Majara), Ha 'Mamotho, Ha Bosofo, Ha Fako, Ha Jobo, Ha Khoabane, Ha Lekoro, Ha Lenono, Ha Lephoi, Ha Lesoiti, Ha Lithupa, Ha Maja, Ha Majara, Ha Makhalanyane, Ha Makhoathi, Ha Mamotho, Ha Mathula, Ha Mohalanyane, Ha Mohasoa, Ha Mosalla, Ha Mothae, Ha Motloheloa, Ha Motsu, Ha Mpesi, Ha Nkhata, Ha Ntlama, Ha Ntsane, Ha Qhali, Ha Rafutho, Ha Ramakha, Ha Ramoejane, Ha Rapheko, Ha Raphuthi, Ha Rasenkisi, Ha Rathoko, Ha Seeiso, Ha Sekete, Ha Sofonia, Ha Teronko, Ha Thiba-Khoali, Ha Tonki, Khokhotsaneng, Lekhalong, Lihaseng, Liolong, Liphookoaneng, Mafikaneng, Mafikaneng (Ha Khechane), Mahlabatheng, Majakaneng, Masekoeng, Monyakoana, Ntlo-kholo (Ha Sepake), Ntlo-kholo (Mahaheng), Ntlokholo, Sekantšing, Sekhutloaneng and Thaba-Khupa.

References

External links
 Google map of community villages

Populated places in Maseru District